Ab Garmag (also Romanized as Āb Garmag; also known as Āb Garmak) is a village in Zaz-e Sharqi Rural District, Zaz va Mahru District, Aligudarz County, Lorestan Province, Iran. At the 2006 census, its population was 46, in 8 families.

References 

Towns and villages in Aligudarz County